Mix94.5 (official call sign 6MIX) is a commercial FM radio station owned by Southern Cross Austereo in Perth, Western Australia, and is part of Southern Cross Austereo's Hit Network.

History
The station originally began as 6KY, beginning broadcasting on 23 October 1941 on 1210 kHz and would eventually end up at the frequency 1206 kHz. The original building, at 17-19 James Street, East Perth, was the first building in Western Australia to be built specifically as a radio station. Consisting of five studios and an auditorium, the station was then owned by the Australian Workers' Union. On 1 June 1991, under then General Manager Peter Perrin, 6KY became one of two Perth radio stations to convert from the AM to FM bands. The station became known upon conversion to FM as 6KYFM, and later as 94.5 KYFM, with the official call sign 6JKY, the transition from AM to FM was considered one of the most successful in Australia. The Perth conversion process was in fact the second round of auctions for that city as the first round was unsuccessful, leaving 96FM, the first and only commercial FM station in the city. The on-air identity was later shortened to 94.5FM under the management of well-known Perth broadcaster Gary Roberts and then around 1997–1998 adopted the name Mix94.5. The official call sign is now 6MIX.

In September 2005, Mix94.5 changed its logo.

In March 2007, Mix94.5 and sister station 92.9 moved from the premises at 283 Rokeby Road, Subiaco to a new purpose-built broadcast centre at 450 Roberts Road, Subiaco.

The switch between Mix94.5's Rokeby Road studios and the new purpose-built broadcast centre in Roberts Road took place at 2 pm on 5 March. The first song played was "Friday on My Mind" by The Easybeats which was #43 in the "Top 294 Songs For Grown Ups" that Mix94.5 was playing across the long weekend.

In May 2009 the station began broadcasting its signal on Digital Radio as well. Perth was the first Australian city to switch the digital transmitters.

In December 2020, Mix94.5 joined the SCA Hit Network brand, replacing its sister station 92.9 who rebranded as Triple M.

Ratings 
Mix94.5 has a reputation across Australia and in Perth as one of the most beloved radio stations as it has dominated radio ratings since the final survey of 1999.

In 2006, in the second radio ratings survey of the year, Mix94.5 topped the survey as the most popular per-capita station in Australia. Mix94.5 attracted 18.1% of listeners whilst other radio stations across Australia such as Sydney's 2GB, Melbourne's 3AW, Brisbane's FM104 MMM and Adelaide's Mix102.3 achieved between 13 and 16.5% of listeners.

Mix94.5 remained the most highly rated radio station in Perth for 12 and a half years, from 1999 to 2012. This dominant period culminated in the station winning its 100th consecutive radio ratings survey in May 2012. Mix94.5 proved its dominance again within Perth in 2013 as it topped a number of categories in the first radio ratings survey of the year. It managed to knock off ABC's local Perth radio station as the No.1 breakfast radio station and also topped the drive time category, beating 92.9.

In 2003, just after the arrival of Nova 93.7, there was a gradual decrease in listeners in the first half of the year. The 18-54 demographic was being targeted by local station 96FM and 720AM which lost Mix94.5 5.4% of listeners within this demographic. Despite this loss in the first half of 2003, Mix94.5 retained its presiding lead as the highest-rated radio station in Perth.

References

External links
Mix94.5 website

Adult contemporary radio stations in Australia
Radio stations established in 1941
Radio stations in Perth, Western Australia
1941 establishments in Australia